Live in London is the first extended play by Australian hard rockers, Johnny Diesel and the Injectors. The four tracks were recorded live in May 1989 and released in July of that year via Chrysalis Records and EMI Music. The group were touring the United Kingdom in mid-1989 and broadcast a live performance, via BBC Radio 1, for the Tommy Vance Sessions, which was produced by Tony Wilson. The EP reached No. 27 on the ARIA Albums Chart. Three of the tracks appear on their previous studio album, Johnny Diesel and the Injectors, (March 1989). While "Rat Pack" was a new track.

Track listing 

 CD and vinyl Chrysalis Records/EMI Music (CDCHM 321728)
 All tracks written by Mark Denis Lizotte  Johnny Diesel or Diesel.
 "Burn"
 "Rat Pack"
 "Parisienne Hotel"
 "Lookin' for Love"

Weekly Performance

Personnel

Johnny Diesel and the Injectors
 Johnny Diesel: – vocals, guitar
 Bernie Bremond: – saxophones, backing vocals
 Johnny "Tatt" Dalzell: – bass guitar
 Yak Sherrit: – drums

Recording details
 Producer: – Tony Wilson at BBC Radio 1 for Tommy Vance Sessions hosted by Tommy Vance
 Audio engineer: – Mike Walter

Art works
 Cover photo: – Chrystene Carrol (for Available Light), Matthew Deller
 Cover art: – ADM Production

References

1989 debut EPs
Diesel (musician) albums
1989 live albums
Live EPs